Alfie Darling is a 1975 British comedy drama film directed by Ken Hughes. The film premiered at the Universal Cinema in London on 6 March 1975. It is the sequel to the film Alfie (1966), with Alan Price taking over Michael Caine's role of Alfie. Price also penned the movie title song, The film is also known as Oh Alfie!.

The Sequel cost £500,000 to produce and promote. eventually Alfie Darling made £2.5 million at the UK box office, finishing 7th as the most popular movie in the UK. Performed and released as a single by Cilla Black who was also the first to record the title song based on the original movie, penned by Burt Bacharach and Hal David.

It is based on the 1970 novel of the same name by Bill Naughton (who wrote the play upon which the first film was based).

Plot
After experiencing a failure in the ending of the earlier film, Alfie - now working as a London to France HGV driver alongside Bakey (Paul Copley) - decides to get back to his old self. And his new occupation provides new opportunities to do so. The film starts as Bakey drives the truck through customs in France, while Alfie has sex with an English hitchhiker (Vicki Michelle) in the back until the customs' officer catches her topless.

When arriving at their destination, he spots a woman (Jill Townsend) in a sports car. They start racing until the police break it up. Alfie soon finds comfort by flirting with the married waitress Louise (Rula Lenska), who takes him to her apartment. During the night, her husband returns from his fishing trip, but Bakey, outside in the truck, sounds the horn as a warning.

Alfie later catches up with the woman from the race and learns her name is Abby and that she is a sophisticated magazine editor. When she turns him down, he proceeds to stalk her until, after another car chase, she finally agrees to a date. When Alfie gets his wish, he suffers erectile dysfunction and leaves her apartment in anger.

This failure causes him to use his little black book to contact women with whom he has a casual relationship. However, some of these encounters lead him into trouble. He faces the consequences of an encounter with Norma (Sheila White) and the wrath of the husband of older Fay (Joan Collins), when said husband discovers Alfie's wallet under their bed.

With Fay's encouragement, Alfie apologizes to Abby about leaving her apartment in a huff and asks her for a proper dinner.

On a holiday in France, he tells her what he never says to his lovers – that he loves her and wants her to marry him. She initially refuses. Alfie angrily insists that he has asked her to marry him, demanding to know what the hell is wrong with her that she refused. As he leaves their hotel room, he tells her that if she is making an idiot of him, he will kill her.

Back in the UK, Alfie suffers a minor accident and is bed-ridden. Abby pays him a visit to apologise for refusing his marriage proposal, and expresses her acceptance. She then has to take a quick work-related flight.

When Abby leaves for the airport, Alfie's older neighbor, Claire (Annie Ross), hears from another neighbor that Alfie can't move, she lets herself into his apartment and serves him tea. When Alfie comments on Claire's perfume, she reveals her true feelings for him by suddenly entering his bed and taking her top off. She ignores his protests but then her attempts to mount him fix his back, and he escapes before she succeeds in making actual intimate contact.

Alfie catches Abby before her flight takes off, and they decide to marry the following day. In the morning Alfie waits for her in the airport, not having heard that her plane has crashed without any survivors. Upon learning the news, Alfie drives to the crash site and cries over the wreckage.

Cast
 Alan Price as Alfie Elkins
 Jill Townsend as Abby Summers
 Paul Copley as Bakey
 Joan Collins as Fay
 Sheila White as Norma
 Annie Ross as Claire
 Hannah Gordon as Dora
 Rula Lenska as Louise
 Minah Bird as Gloria
 Derek Smith as Harold
 Vicki Michelle as Bird
 Brian Wilde as Doctor
 Jenny Hanley as Receptionist

Production
The film was based on the novel Alfie Darling by Bill Naughton, which was published in 1970. It was a sequel to Alfie, which had been a radio play, then play and film.

The films starred singer Alan Price who had featured prominently in O Lucky Man!. Patsy Kensit appears in a small role.

Critical reception
The film was described by one reviewer as a "prize catastrophe". He was critical of Price's performance and described the idea of making him a leading man as "misbegotten". Time Out called the film "an advert with no product to sell".

The Monthly Film Bulletin criticised the film's "coarse triviality." Derek Malcolm in The Guardian wrote that the film was "pitched... on the level of Confessions of a Window Cleaner."

Filmink said it "suffers very, very, very badly in comparison to the original, which turned Michael Caine into a star (you may feel differently if you like Alan Price)."

References

External links
 
 
Alfie Darling at Reel Streets
Alfie Darling at BFI

1975 films
1975 comedy-drama films
Adultery in films
British comedy-drama films
British sequel films
British sex comedy films
Casual sex in films
1970s English-language films
Films shot at EMI-Elstree Studios
Films based on British novels
Films directed by Ken Hughes
Films set in London
1970s sex comedy films
1970s British films